Duje Pejković (born May 19, 1998) is a Croatian professional water polo player. He is currently playing for VK Jadran Split. He is 6 ft 4 in (1.93 m) tall and weighs 236 lb (107 kg).

References

External links

 Duje Pejković on Instagram
 Duje Pejković on Facebook

1998 births
Living people
Croatian male water polo players